The Southern Yan (398–410) was a Xianbei-led dynastic state during the era of Sixteen Kingdoms in China. Its territory roughly coincided with modern Shandong. Its founder Murong De was a son of Murong Huang and brother of Murong Jun and Murong Chui and therefore was an imperial prince during both Former Yan and Later Yan.

All rulers of the Southern Yan declared themselves "emperors".

History 
In the years after the Battle of Canhe Slope in 395, the Later Yan began to quickly collapse, losing most territory to the Northern Wei. Murong De, uncle of Later Yan emperor Murong Bao, successfully defended some cities in the southern part of the state, including Yecheng and Huatai, and eventually claimed the imperial title in 398, forming Southern Yan. Murong De nearly captured and killed Murong Bao when the latter came to Huatai, unaware that his uncle had declared independence. Murong Bao managed to flee back north when he heard, and would continue to defend the remaining territory of Later Yan. Just a year later when Murong De was on campaign a traitor opened the gates of Huatai to Northern Wei forces, leaving Murong De stranded without any territory. He decided to attack Qing Province of the Jin Dynasty, which corresponds to modern central and eastern Shandong. He took the province with ease and successfully reestablished Southern Yan. Murong De would rule for 6 more years after this, in which Southern Yan was peaceful and prosperous to live in. However Murong De was getting older and sicker and was without any living sons. However in 405 a nephew of his called Murong Chao arrived in Guanggu (the capital of Southern Yan) having previously been a beggar in Later Qin, and was almost immediately made heir. Murong De died that same fall and was succeeded by Murong Chao. Murong Chao’s mother and wife were still in Later Qin and Murong Chao agreed to become a vassal and give up his court musicians in return for their safe passage to Southern Yan. In 409 Murong Chao attacked the Jin for prisoners to be trained as new musicians. This prompted an invasion of Southern Yan by the Jin general Liu Yu. Liu Yu defeated the Southern Yan army at the  Battle of Linqu and then besieged Guanggu, eventually taking the city. Murong Chao was captured and executed and Southern Yan was annexed by Jin

Rulers of the Southern Yan

See also
Xianbei
List of past Chinese ethnic groups
Wu Hu
Emperor Wu of Liu Song

References

 
Dynasties in Chinese history
Former countries in Chinese history
398 establishments
4th-century establishments in China
5th-century disestablishments in China